National Orchestra of Korea is a government-established orchestra of traditional Korean instruments. The orchestra was founded in 1995.

See also
National Theater of Korea
Contemporary culture of South Korea
Korean art
Korean theater
List of concert halls

References

External links
Official site

Jung District, Seoul
Korean art
1950 establishments in South Korea
Theatres in South Korea
Korea
Musical groups established in 1995

ko:국립중앙극장